The McGregor Range is a mountain range in the Central Interior of British Columbia, located between the main spine of the Rocky Mountains and the Fraser River on the northeast and southwest, and between the Torpy River on its southeast and the McGregor River on its northwest.  Though adjacent to the Rockies and very mountainous, the McGregor Range is part of the McGregor Plateau, a subdivision of the Fraser Plateau.

References

Landforms of British Columbia, S. Holland. BC Govt, 1976

Mountain ranges of British Columbia
Central Interior of British Columbia
Rocky Mountains